Reinaldo Ocampo (born 6 January 1987) is a Paraguayan international footballer who plays for General Díaz, as a midfielder.

Career
Born in Asunción, Ocampo has played club football for Libertad, Tacuary, Rubio Ñu and Sol de América.

He made his international debut for Paraguay in 2012.

References

1987 births
Living people
Paraguayan footballers
Paraguay international footballers
Club Libertad footballers
Club Rubio Ñu footballers
Club Sol de América footballers
Sportivo Luqueño players
Association football midfielders